The 2018 Copa do Brasil fourth stage was the fourth stage of the 2018 Copa do Brasil football competition. It was played from 4 to 19 April 2018. A total of 10 teams competed in the fourth stage to decide five places in the final stages of the 2018 Copa do Brasil.

Draw
The draw for the fourth stage was held on 19 March 2018, 11:00 at CBF headquarters in Rio de Janeiro. The 10 qualified teams were in a single group (CBF ranking shown in parentheses).

Format
In the fourth stage, each tie was played on a home-and-away two-legged basis. If tied on aggregate, the away goals rule would not be used, extra time would not be played and the penalty shoot-out would be used to determine the winner.

Matches
All times are Brasília time, BRT (UTC−3)

|}

Match 71

Ponte Preta won 3–1 on aggregate and advanced to the round of 16.

Match 72

Atlético Paranaense won 4–3 on aggregate and advanced to the round of 16.

Match 73

Goiás won 4–2 on aggregate and advanced to the round of 16.

Match 74

Tied 2–2 on aggregate, Vitória won on penalties and advanced to the round of 16.

Match 75

Atlético Mineiro won 6–2 on aggregate and advanced to the round of 16.

References

2018 Copa do Brasil